The Canon EOS 6D Mark II is a 26.2-megapixel full-frame digital single-lens reflex camera announced by Canon on June 29, 2017.

Impressions from the Canon press event were mixed, with many saying the camera is "a sizeable upgrade, but feels dated". Critics point out that the 6D does not support 4K video shooting and its 45 AF points are dense around the center, resulting in slower focus and recompose maneuvers when photographing moving subjects.

Main features
New features over the EOS 6D are:
 New 26.2 megapixel CMOS sensor with Dual Pixel CMOS AF, (total 27.1 megapixels), instead of 20mp CMOS sensor with contrast detect.
 DIGIC 7, standard ISO 100–40000, expandable from L: 50 to H1: 51200, H2: 102400, compares (DIGIC 5+, ISO 100 – 25600, H 51200, H2 102400).
 New 7560-pixel RGB+IR metering sensor to aid the AF system
 45 cross-type AF points, compared to 11, with center point is the only cross-type.
 At f/8, autofocusing is only possible with the center AF point. However, 27 will autofocus when the body is attached to only 2 lens/teleconverter combination with a maximum aperture of f/8. The EF 100–400mm f/4.5–5.6L IS II lens, with Extender EF 1.4x III and EF 200–400mm f/4L IS Extender 1.4x lens, used with Extender EF 2x III (AF at 27 focus points, and the central 9 points acting as cross-type points). The EOS 6D Mark II is the first non-professional full-frame EOS body that can autofocus in this situation; previous non-professional bodies could not autofocus if the maximum aperture of an attached lens/teleconverter combination was smaller than f/5.6 (This feature had previously been included in three non-professional APS-C bodies: first the 80D, followed by the 77D and EOS 800D/Rebel T7i.) 
 At f/5.6, center AF point supporting down to EV -2.
 With f/2.8 lens, AF sensitive down to EV -3.
 High-speed Continuous Shooting at up to 6.5 fps, 4 fps in Live view mode with Servo AF.
 For anti-flicker shooting: max. approx. 5.6 shots/sec.
 Low speed continuous shooting: 3 fps
 Built-in NFC and Bluetooth.
 1080p at 60/50 fps video recording capability
 4K time-lapse movie
 Built-in HDR and time-lapse recording capability
 Anti-flicker
 Flash Sync Speed 1/180
 Battery life: 1,200 shots. (1,100 at 0 °C/32 °F; 380 with live view or 340 with live view at 0 °C/32 °F.)
 New Intelligent viewfinder with grid, dual axis electronic level, warning icons.
 Fully articulated touchscreen compared fixed screen on EOS 6D.
 Supporting Panning mode in SCN.

References

External links

DXO Mark Review: Great color and ISO performance

Cameras introduced in 2017
Live-preview digital cameras
Canon EOS DSLR cameras
Full-frame DSLR cameras